Stanhopea tigrina is a species of plant in the family Orchidaceae, endemic to Mexico.

References
 Bateman ex Lindl., Sert. Orchid.: t. 1 (1838).
 Hernández, F. (Casimiro Gómez Ortega). 1790. Francisci Hernandi, medici atque historici Philippi II, Hispan et Indiar. Regis, et totius novi orbis archiatri, opera : cum edita, tum inedita, ad autographi fidem et integritatem expressa, impensa et jussu regio Vol. I, Libro IV, p. 406.

External links

tigrina
Endemic orchids of Mexico
Plants described in 1838